Gate agents work at the boarding gates of airports, assisting passengers in boarding their flights and in disembarking their flights.

About
Shifts vary with the particular airline's flight schedule, and, like ticket agents, gate agents must wear uniforms and put on a pleasant face for the public. Agents have a variety of duties depending on the size of the airline, including making boarding announcements, assigning seats, handling standby passengers, monitoring jet way doors during boarding and disembarkation, and assisting in customer service duties.

Gate agents are able to see everything about each customer's flight ticket. They are able to tell how much someone paid for it, where it was bought, and when it was bought.

References

Transport occupations